The CMLL Día de Muertos (2019) (Spanish for "Day of the Dead") is two professional wrestling supercard event, scripted and produced by the Mexican Lucha Libre promotion Consejo Mundial de Lucha Libre (CMLL), held to celebrate the Mexican Day of the Dead celebration. The shows will take place on November 1 and November 3, 2019  in CMLL's main venue, Arena México, in Mexico City, Mexico. Many of the wrestlers working the shows will wear the traditional Día de Muertos face and body paint for the Día de Muerto event. From around the mid-point of each show the losing wrestlers will be dragged to El Inframundo ("The Underworld"; in actuality a side entrance in the arena) by a group of wrestlers dressed up as minions of the ruler of the underworld. This will be the sixth year that CMLL celebrates the Día de Muertos in such a manner

As part of the shows Sansón will defended the Rey del Inframundo ("King of the Underworld") championship that he won at the 2017 Día de Muertos show and successfully defended on the 2018 show as well. The November 3 show will feature a Singles match between Micro-Estrellas Microman and Chamuel

Production

Background
The October 31, 2014 Día de Muertos show was the first of Mexican professional wrestling promotion Consejo Mundial de Lucha Libre's Dia de los Muertos ("Day of the Dead") celebrations in 2014 and began a tradition of CMLL holding a major show to celebrate the Latin American holiday. As part of their Dia de los Muerte celebrations CMLL admitted all kids in costumes for free for the show. CMLL held a second Dia de los Muerte celebration on Sunday November 2 as well. Both shows included the Edcanes, CMLL's ring girls and various wrestlers dressed up in traditional Día de Muertos garb. In 2014, CMLL also turned the basement of Arena México into a haunted house attraction before each show. CMLL has held one or more shows to celebrate the holiday annually since 2014, with 2019 marking the sixth year in a row. The 2019 show featured the Mexican god of death known as "Amotlamini" or "Amo-tlamini" as the main character directing his minions during the show. Amo-tlamini will be portrayed by young wrestler Retro.

Storylines
The 2019 Dia de Muertos shows will feature twelve professional wrestling matches scripted by CMLL with some wrestlers involved in scripted feuds. Wrestlers portray either heels (referred to as rudos in Mexico, those that play the part of the "bad guys") or faces (técnicos in Mexico, the "good guy" characters) as they perform.

At the 2017 Día de Muertos show, Sansón outlasted El Cuatrero, Diamante Azul, Forastero, Hechicero, Mistico, Soberano Jr. and Valiente in a torneo cibernetico elimination match to become the first ever Rey del Inframundo ("King of the Underworld"). While Sansón was given a championship belt to symbolize his victory it is not a championship, but a tournament trophy that is not defended outside of the annual tournament in the vein of CMLL's Leyenda de Plata or Leyenda de Azul tournaments. The following year, at the 2018 Día de Muertos show Sansón successfully defended the Rey del Inframundo championship against Templario. At an October 18 CMLL press conference, the company announced that Sansón would be defending the Rey del Inframundo ("King of the Underworld") championship on the November 1 show. The challenger would be determined by a torneo cibernetico elimination match held on October 29. CMLL later announced the 10 wrestlers who would compete in the torneo cibernetic: Rey Cometa, Universo 2000 Jr., Audaz, Disturbio, Dulce Gardenia, Pólvora, Star Jr., Tiger, Black Panther and Virus.

During the same press conference CMLL announced that the Micro-Estrellas Microman and Chamuel would face off on the Sunday November 3 Día de Muertos show, continuing their feud that saw Microman defeat and unmask Chamuel at the CMLL 86th Anniversary Show.

Results

November 1

November 3

References

2019 in Mexico
2019 in professional wrestling
CMLL Día de Muertos
Events in Mexico City
November 2019 events in Mexico